The 1857 Connecticut gubernatorial election was held on April 6, 1857. Former Lieutenant Governor and Republican nominee Alexander H. Holley defeated former congressman and Democratic nominee Samuel Ingham with 50.44% of the vote.

General election

Candidates
Major party candidates

Alexander H. Holley, Republican
Samuel Ingham, Democratic

Results

References

1857
Connecticut
Gubernatorial